Pól Ó Muiri (b 1965) is an Irish journalist, poet, and Irish-language editor of The Irish Times.

Biography
Ó Muiri was born in Belfast in 1965. He attended St Mary's Christian Brothers' Grammar School, Belfast and then Queen's University Belfast from which he was awarded a BA (Hons) in Celtic Studies and Scholastic Philosophy followed by a PhD in Celtic Studies.

In 1991, he was given the Sam Hanna Bell Fellowship in Literature from the Cultural Traditions Group.

Career
Ó Muiri is a journalist and currently Irish language editor of The Irish Times.

He writes principally in Irish, his works covering poetry and short fiction in both languages, as well as a biography of Seosamh Mac Grianna.

Bibliography

Faoi Scáil na Ríona, 1991 
Dinnseanchas, 1992 
Ginealach Ultach, 1993
Siosafas: Gearrscéalta, 1995 
Abhar Filíochta, 1995
D-Day, 1995
A Flight from Shadow: The Life & Works of Seosamh Mac Grianna, 1999
Is Mise Ísmeáél, 2000 
Na Móinteacha, 2004
Seosamh Mac Grianna: Míreanna Saoil, 2007
Cold War, 2009

References

External links
http://laganpress.co/authors/pol-o-muiri
https://tuairisc.ie/scribhneoiri/polomuiri/
https://www.belfasttelegraph.co.uk/opinion/columnists/archive/pol-o-muiri/
http://www.coisceim.ie/acht.html

People educated at St. Mary's Christian Brothers' Grammar School, Belfast
Alumni of Queen's University Belfast
Journalists from Belfast
Irish newspaper editors
The Irish Times people
Irish-language writers
1965 births
20th-century Irish writers
21st-century Irish writers
Living people